Pablo Carreño Busta was the defending champion, but he did not participate.

Elias Ymer won the title, defeating Bjorn Fratangelo in the final, 6–3, 6–2.

Seeds

Draw

Finals

Top half

Bottom half

References
 Main Draw
 Qualifying Draw

Citta di Caltanissetta - Singles
2015 Singles